Universal Studios Beijing is a Universal theme park in Beijing that opened on September 20, 2021 as part of Universal Beijing Resort. Invited-only test operation started on September 1, 2021. The park would become the fifth Universal Studios-branded theme park in the world, the seventh Universal-built park overall, and the third in Asia, after Universal Studios Japan and Universal Studios Singapore. However, it would also be the first Universal-built park in Asia to not include Sesame Street as one of its licensed properties.

The project was announced on October 13, 2014 with the plan to invest 20 billion RMB (US$3.3 billion) into the new theme park; a groundbreaking ceremony was held on October 31, 2016. It features attractions themed primarily to Universal-owned movies, TV shows, animation, and music, as well as licensed properties from other companies (e.g., Warner Bros. etc.)

History 
It was reported in March 2012 that officials from Comcast and its subsidiary NBCUniversal were meeting with  China's sixth-largest city, Tianjin,  to discuss a possible Universal park in the port city. Previously, there are said to have been many on and off again discussions for building a possible Universal theme park in China over the years going back to when Hong Kong Disneyland was first announced. On January 7, 2014, Shanghai Securities News reported that an application to begin construction on a Universal Studios park in the Tongzhou District of Beijing was filed, with work to begin in late 2014 on this $2 billion project. Demolition of existing structures had already begun, with the goal of opening the park in 2018. Comcast CEO Brian L. Roberts predicted that they expected to take market share away from Disney Parks, Experiences and Products chains with their plans to invest in their Universal Studios theme parks. In regards to the competition, Roberts said "We’re doubling down on theme parks. We think that there is a lot of 'there' there in the theme-park business for many years to come and that we have a low market share — and only one way to go."

On October 13, 2014, Universal Parks & Resorts CEO Thomas L. Williams announced they signed a deal to build Universal Studios Beijing and is scheduled to open in 2019 instead. The overall investment in the theme park will be more than 20 billion RMB (US$3.3 billion). It will be jointly owned by Beijing Shouhuan Cultural Tourism Investment Co., Ltd. (BSH Investment), a consortium of four state-owned companies, and Universal Parks & Resorts. Estimated at about 1,000 acres of Beijing property, it will include an assortment of attractions in the 300-acre theme park from other Universal theme parks as well as new attractions that reflects China's cultural heritage. Outside the theme park, there will be a Universal CityWalk retail/dining zone as well as a themed Universal resort hotel. No attractions were officially revealed when the project was first announced, although many speculated that they would include popular attractions from Universal-owned franchises, as well as third party properties such as Harry Potter and Transformers.

On October 28, 2016, the park broke ground, while also announcing that the opening had been delayed from 2019 until 2020. The construction will create approximately 40,000 new jobs. According to Duan Qiang, Chairman of Beijing Tourism Group, one of the shareholders of Beijing Shouhuan, the first phase of the park will provide between 8,000 and 10,000 jobs. One hotel will reportedly be Universal-branded while the other will carry the NUO brand. More Chinese elements, such as fireworks and parades, are planned for phase two and three in the future.

According to Comcast's CEO Brian L. Roberts, the Comcast-owned Universal Beijing Resort shall open "on time and on budget in 2021". Construction of Phase 1 of Universal Beijing Resort (which includes the full Universal Studios Beijing) completed in April 2021, and  opened on September 20, 2021.

Lands and attractions 
The park's seven themed zones surround a large central lagoon. Each area features meet-and-greet locations, restaurants, quick-service dining, food carts, and retail stores and carts.

Hollywood Boulevard 
Themed after the real Hollywood Boulevard, in Hollywood, CA, this area acts as the entryway to the park. The area also contains a music plaza, Mel's Diner, and Sunset Grille restaurant. The park's daily "Universal on Parade" premiered alongside the park on September 20, 2021, and features themed floats, characters, and performers based on Universal's Despicable Me/Minions, Shrek, Madagascar, and Kung Fu Panda franchises.

The Wizarding World of Harry Potter - Hogsmeade 

Themed after the Harry Potter franchise. Retail shops within the area include: Hogsmeade Station, Zonko's Joke Shop, Gladrags Wizardwear, Wiseacre's Wizarding Equipment, Owl Post & Owlery, Ollivanders Wand Shop in Hogsmeade, Dervish and Banges, Honeydukes, and Filch's Emporium of Confiscated Goods. Restaurants in this area include Hog's head and Three Broomsticks.

Minion Land 

Themed after Illumination's Minions, Despicable Me, and Sing franchises. This is the second Universal theme park to have a full-scale Despicable Me themed area, after Universal Studios Japan. This area includes The Lair - Villain Restaurant.

Kung Fu Panda Land of Awesomeness 

Themed after DreamWorks Animation's Kung Fu Panda movie series. The first entirely-indoor land for a Universal theme-park. This area includes a restaurant themed after Mr. Ping's Noodle House.

Transformers: Metrobase 
Themed after the Transformers media franchise. The area's rides and layout are similar to Universal's Island of Adventure's Marvel Super Hero Island. The area includes the Energon Power Station counter-service restaurant.

Jurassic World Isla Nublar 
Themed after the Jurassic World movie franchise. This area includes the Hammond's restaurant, named after the John Hammond character from the franchise.

Waterworld 
Themed after the Waterworld film. This is the first Universal theme park to have a dedicated Waterworld themed area, and includes the Drifter's Cantina restaurant.

Transportation

Subway
The Universal Resort station of Beijing Subway on Batong line and Line 7 opened on August 26, 2021.

Visitors to Beijing Universal Resort can take the subway to the train station, from exits B, C, D about 7 minutes walk to Beijing Universal Avenue entrance security room.

Bus
Tongzhou, Beijing's 589 and T116 busses were extended to Universal Beijing Resort on August 26, 2021.

See also
 2021 in amusement parks
 Universal Beijing Resort

Notes

References 

 
Amusement parks in Beijing
Universal Parks & Resorts
Universal Parks & Resorts attractions by name
Operating amusement attractions
2021 establishments in China